Satyendra Pakhalé (also known as Satyen Pakhalé; born 1967) is a designer, industrial designer and architect. He realizes projects from industrial design, applied research to design vision of the future, technologically challenging product development, manufacturing, highly crafted pieces, exhibitions and architecture. He works in the fields of product design, including consumer electronics, health care, aviation, mobility, home appliances, furniture, digital products & computers, and interior design and architecture. In 2008, he was selected as one of L’Uomo Vogue magazine's 80 most influential creative people with vision worldwide in design and architecture. His works are in permanent collections of several museums worldwide.

Early life
Satyen Pakhalé was born and raised in central Maharashtra, India. He graduated with a bachelor's degree in Mechanical Design Engineering from Visvesvaraya Regional College of Engineering, Nagpur (now Visvesvaraya National Institute of Technology). He then studied for a Master's degree in Design at the Industrial Design Centre, Indian Institute of Technology, Mumbai, and Product Design at the Art Center College of Design, Switzerland, Europe.

Design works
Pakhalé has been internationally active in the field of industrial design, art and architecture since 1993.

He worked initially at Philips Design—new business creation department on innovative products in the areas of digital communication and mobility. In 1998 he set up his own design practice in Amsterdam, Netherlands.

One of his solo design exhibitions 'From Projects to Products' of his body of works took place in the Stedelijk Museum in Amsterdam, and another at Otto Gallery Bologna, Italy, curated by Paola Antonelli, curator of Museum of Modern Art, New York and at Gallery Ammann, Cologne, Germany.

The design manager and marketing executive Alceo Serafini has described Pakhalé's work as follows:

In 2014, Pakhalé is selected as one of ten Must-See Artists-Designers at Miami Art Week 2014 for ‘Design at Fairchild – Satyendra Pakhale’ exhibition at the Fairchild Tropical Botanic Garden, Coral Gables, Florida.

Theoretical position
‘Culture of Creation’ is an active studio practice, an ongoing research platform cofounded by Satyendra Pakhalé together with Arch. Dr. Tiziana Proietti in 2013, based on decades of studio practice coupled with theoretical applied research. Culture is always dynamic, always evolving and changing at any time in history. The notion of a ‘Culture of Creation’ refers to the primal and innate impulse behind human making. The ‘Culture of Creation’ platform brings critical thinking and studio practice together while covering topics such as social modernity and secular humanism, atmospheres of spaces and objects, human senses and perception, poetic analogy of form and sensorial design. ‘Culture of Creation’   explores the inner dimension of objects and spaces. From the start Satyendra Pakhalé has cultivated a design practice focused on the culture of making, be it craftsmanship or highly technological manufacturing, inspired by tireless research on the mentioned topics. This theoretical position, 'Culture of Creation', was first published in a comprehensive monograph called 'Satyendra Pakhalé Culture of Creation' by nai010 Publisher, Netherlands Architecture Institute, Rotterdam, NL.

At the heart of Satyendra Pakhalé's studio practice as a ‘Culture of Creation’ are two key considerations. The first, his conviction that cultural influences without succumbing to nostalgia, false narratives or traditionalism, have to be factored in. The second is his perception of the rational, the emotional and the multi-sensorial as being one. By reflecting upon and then synthesizing these two aspects, he has developed a concept of ‘social modernity’ rooted in social cohesion that is at the same time contemporary and forward-looking. In Satyendra Pakhalé's view the project of ‘modernity’ is still a work in progress in most societies, to achieve diverse, equitable and inclusive social cohesion. Design has to help bring the disintegrating elements together, unite them and then weave them into a flourishing contemporary society. We ought to rebuild society on the foundations of ‘social modernity’. In Pakhalé's view, ‘Design is a cultural act about justice as much as utility and beauty.’

Awards and recognition
Pakhalé has received the following awards and recognition:

 Red Dot Award, for Add-On Radiator, Essen, Germany, 2016
 Green Good Design Award, The Chicago Athenaeum Museum of Architecture and Design, Chicago, USA, 2016
 Distinguished Alumnus Award IITB 2013, Indian Institute of Technology Bombay
 Bharat Sammann, New Delhi, India, 2013
 NRI Award, for exemplary achievements, NRI – Non-Resident Indian Institute London, UK, 2012
 Red Dot Award, for Add-On Radiator, Essen, Germany, 2008
 International Design Award, category Interior Furniture, Los Angeles, USA, 2007
 Editor's Choice Award, for Akasma, ICFF – International Contemporary Furniture Fair, New York City, 2003

Major collections
Pakhalé work in the following permanent collections:

Akasma Baskets, 2002, Montreal Museum of Fine Arts, Montreal, Canada
Bird Chaise Lounge, 2002, Stedelijk Museum, Amsterdam, Netherlands
Add-On Radiator, 2004, Montreal Museum of Fine Arts
Stool, 2008, Victoria and Albert Museum, London, United Kingdom
LAGORI POST-COMPUTER GAME, 2002, Stedelijk Museum, Amsterdam, Netherlands
KALPA, 2002, Stedelijk Museum, Amsterdam, Netherlands
AKASMA 1, 2002, Stedelijk Museum, Amsterdam, Netherlands
AKASMA 2, 2002, Stedelijk Museum, Amsterdam, Netherlands
AKASMA 3, 2002, Stedelijk Museum, Amsterdam, Netherlands
Magis DESK MAT, 2002, Stedelijk Museum, Amsterdam, Netherlands
SATYENDRA PAKHALÉ CULTURAL NOMAD. FROM PROJECTS TO PRODUCTS / DAL PROGETTO AL PRODOTTO
TIZIANA BONANNI, 2002, Stedelijk Museum, Amsterdam, Netherlands
Siège Multichair Panther, 2002, Centre Pompidou, Paris, France
Radiateur Add-On, 2003–2007, Centre Pompidou, Paris, France
RCCC/Roll Carbon Ceramic Chair, 2003–2007, M+, Hong Kong

Major Exhibitions

2002: "From Projects to Products" Curator Ingeborg de Roode, Solo Exhibition Stedelijk Museum Amsterdam, Amsterdam, The Netherlands
2003: "Design by Heart" Curator Paola Antonelli, Solo Exhibition Otto Gallery, Bologna, Italy
2008: "OriginS" Curator Gabrielle Ammann, Solo Exhibition Ammann gallery, Cologne, Germany
2014: "Design at Fairchild"- "FISH at Tropical Botanic Garden", Curators Cristina Grajales, Gabrielle Ammann, Nannett Zapata Solo Exhibition Design Miami, Miami, Florida
2022-2023: "Design+Health"- "Diseño + Salud", Curator Ramón Úbeda Exhibition World Design Capital, Valencia, Spain

Academic contribution
Pakhalé has been regularly invited to give lectures and workshops in North America, Europe, South America and Asia at universities and conferences such as "Catch the Future" at KAISTThe Korean Advanced Institute of Science and Technology </ref> He was visiting faculty at the departments of "Man and Activity" from 1999 to 2005 and "Man and Living" from 2005 to 2006. From 2006 to 2010, he was the Head of the department of Master of "Design for Humanity and Sustainable Living" "Master of Design" graduate program at Design Academy Eindhoven, Netherlands. "Professor of Practice" at the faculty of "Industrial Design Engineering" 2021–2022 at the Delft University of Technology, Netherlands .

Books
 Satyendra Pakhalé Culture of Creation, nai01 Publishers, Rotterdam, NL 2019. .
Contributing authors - Albrto Alessi, Juhani Pallasmaa, Paola Antonelli, Jacques Barsac, Giulio Cappellini, Aric Chen, Cristiano Crosetta, Ingeborg de Roode, Rene Spitz, TizianaProietti, Walter Spink, Vittorio Livi, Marva Griffin and Stefano Marzano

‘His designs suggest a haptic skin-relationship through their sensorial forms, poetic associations and tactile surfaces: they stimulate sensations of intimacy and nearness.’ - Juhani Pallasmaa

 Satyendra Pakhalé, Cultural nomad: From Project to Products – Dal progetto al pradotto, Editoriale Modo, Milano, 2002. .

Paola Antonelli, curator of Museum of Modern Art New York has said, introducing Satyendra Pakhalé's design works:

See also
 List of people from Amsterdam
 Artist of the Day 
 List of Indian artists
 List of ArtCenter College of Design people
 Designers from Amsterdam
 List of Dutch people
 List of Marathi people
 Sustainable design
 Design and Technology
 Indian Institute of Technology

References

Sources
 Designer Satyendra Pakhalé in Amsterdam
 Design at Fairchild / Satyendra Pakhalé / Miami / USA
 One Minute Wonder 47 – Satyendra Pakhalé
 Curiosities – Satyendra Pakhalé talks about Design & Technology
 Satyendra Pakhalé on the Perfect Pencil, the Importance of Curiosity, Core77, USA
 Satyendra Pakhalé Wallspace gallery at Wallpaper
 Satyendra Pakhalé, Cultural nomad: From Project to Products – Dal progetto al pradotto, Editoriale Modo, Milano, 2002. .
 Humanistic and cultural values – Satyendra talks with David about design- part 1
 Sustainable design – Satyendra talk with David about design – part 2
 cultural-nomad
 Democratic Design
 DesignBoom – Satyendral
 Wallpaper – OriginS
 DesignBoom – Contemporaryl
 Designindaba – Craft Debate
 Universal Poetry
 Designindaba industrial 10x10
 Of Indian Origin
 Luciano Bove Design
 DesignBoom – Asia Nowl

External links

 Satyendra Pakhale – Designer / Architect
 Satyendra Pakhale – Curiosities
 Industrial Design with Cultural Content
 Architonic Pakhale
 Artnet Pakhale
 European Design Satyendra Pakhale
 Cappellini Fish Chair
 OFFECCT Grip table Green design
 Pakhale – Hastens Conversation Sofa
 MeToo Magis
 Magical World of Satyendra Pakhale
 Milan meets Mumbai
 Chairblog Pakhale
 Milano Talks
 Imaganary Life Satyendra Pakhale
 Corunum Designer Pakhale
 Lumiaire Pakhale
 Stylepark Add On Radiator
 Tubes Satyendra Pakhale

1967 births
Living people
People from Maharashtra
IIT Bombay alumni
Visvesvaraya National Institute of Technology, Nagpur alumni
Art Center College of Design alumni
20th-century Indian designers
Indian expatriates in the Netherlands
Designers from Amsterdam

Industrial designers
Academic staff of Design Academy Eindhoven